Yavapai is an Upland Yuman language, spoken by Yavapai people in central and western Arizona. There are four dialects: Kwevkepaya, Wipukpaya, Tolkepaya, and Yavepe. Linguistic studies of the Kwevkepaya (Southern), Tolkepaya (Western), Wipukepa (Verde Valley), and Yavepe (Prescott) dialects have been published (Mithun 1999:578).

Yavapai was once spoken across much of north-central and western Arizona, but is now mostly spoken on the Yavapai reservations at Fort McDowell, the Verde Valley and Prescott.

Geographic distribution 
The rate of mutual comprehension between Yavapai and Havasupai–Hualapai is similar to that between Mohave and Maricopa (Biggs 1957).

Warren Gazzam, a Tolkapaya speaker, reported that "you know they (Hualapais) speak the same language as we do, some words or accents are a little different".

Due to extensive cultural interchange, many Yavapai were once bilingual in Apache, and some Apache were bilingual in Yavapai.

Unlike in Havasupai and Hualapai, postaspirated stops cannot appear in word-initial position (Shaterian 1983:215).

Phonology 
Yavapai consonant phonemes are shown below.

Vowels occur short, mid and long in stressed syllables. The contrast is reduced to two lengths in unstressed syllables.

There are two tones on stressed syllables, high level and falling, which are neutralized to mid on unstressed syllables.

Syntax 
Yavapai is a subject-verb-object language.

/-k/ and /-m/ Problem 

According to Martha Kendall, the morphemes /k/ and /m/ are "semantically contrastable," but are pronounced the same. She writes that homophony is present in Yavapai, and /k/ and /m/ are similar in phonological situations, but are syntactically different.

Examples 
Some sample words given in Yavapai translation:

Preservation efforts 
There have been recordings of Yavapai (as well as other Yuman languages) done in 1974, relating to phonology, syntax, and grammar. This was meant to understand the three topics better and to hear them.

There is an effort to revitalize the language. There is a Yavapai language program for adults to learn the language and pass on to future generations.

There have been attempts to save the language in the Yavapai community.

Poetry and stories have been published in Yavapai on several occasions. Yavapai poems are featured in Gigyayk Vo'jka, the anthology of poetry in Yuman languages edited by Hualapai linguist Lucille Watahomigie. Yavapai stories also appear in Spirit Mountain: An Anthology of Yuman Story and Song. Both works are accompanied by English translations, and the poems in Gigyayk Vo'jka also feature a morphological analysis.

Alan Shaterian has published a dictionary of Northeastern Yavapai. Pamela Munro is working on a dictionary and grammar for Tolkepaya.

Footnotes

References
 Biggs, Bruce. 1957. Testing Intelligibility among Yuman Languages. In International Journal of American Linguistics. Vol. 23, No. 2. (April 1957), pp. 57–62. University of Chicago Press.
 Mithun, Marianne. 1999. The Languages of Native North America. Cambridge University Press.
 Shaterian, Alan William. 1983. Phonology and Dictionary of Yavapai. University of California, Berkeley.

External links
 
 Yavapai basic lexicon at the Global Lexicostatistical Database

Indigenous languages of Arizona
Indigenous languages of the Southwestern United States
Indigenous languages of the North American Southwest
Yavapai